The Hustler (German: Der Falschspieler) is a 1920 German silent film directed by Emil Justitz and starring Anita Berber and Hans Albers.

Cast
In alphabetical order
 Hans Albers as Harald Petersen 
 Marian Alma
 Anita Berber as Tänzerin Asta 
 Ilse Götzen
 Emil Mamelok as Falschspieler 
 Elisit Mörtstedt
 Hans Mühlhofer
 Max Neumann as Provinzler 
 Preben J. Rist
 C.W. Tetting
 Anna von Palen as Mutter

References

Bibliography
 Rolf Giesen. The Nosferatu Story: The Seminal Horror Film, Its Predecessors and Its Enduring Legacy. McFarland, 2019.

External links

1920 films
Films of the Weimar Republic
Films directed by Emil Justitz
German silent feature films